Before the 2020 Nagorno-Karabakh war, the economy of the Republic of Artsakh was small, but rapidly growing. The economy of Karabakh showed a relatively quick and confident recovery from the 1991-1994 war. In 1999, the GDP figure was $59 million, 80 percent down on the figure in Soviet times. Yet, the GDP of the Republic of Artsakh reached $114 million in 2005, double the figure in 2001, registering economic growth of 14% (in current prices) in 2005, and in 2009 it registered a GDP of $260 million, which increased to $320 million by 2010.  Nagorno-Karabakh's GDP (PPP) for 2010 was estimated at $1.6 billion.

According to official estimates of the Nagorno-Karabakh Statistical Service, the GDP in current (market) prices increased by 116% between 2001 and 2007. The Consumer Price Index increased only by 34% during this period, which implies a real growth of about 60% in GDP during the six years 2001–2007. In 2007, agriculture accounted for 16% of GDP, manufacturing industries 15%, construction 9%, and the service sector 57%. The share of agriculture in GDP went down from 33% in 2002 to 16% in 2007, while the share of manufacturing and services increased correspondingly.

Most investments were in telecoms, gold mining, diamond polishing, jewelry and agriculture. In the Soviet Union, Nagorno-Karabakh was the largest per capita producer of grapes.

Nagorno-Karabakh is known for its mulberry vodka, commercially produced and exported under the brand name Artsakh by the Artsakh-Alco Brandy Company in Askeran District.

Energy

Up until recently Nagorno-Karabakh Republic was known to operate at least one hydroelectric power plant near Mardakert, which was constructed during the Soviet times. The government hoped to build a number of small hydroelectric power plants — at a cost of $70–$80 million — that would supply both domestic needs and provide opportunities for export. In 2001 the republic imported 60 percent of its electricity from Armenia.

On 12 April 2010 the prime ministers of NKR and Armenia inaugurated "Trghe-1" - the first in series of long anticipated hydro-electric stations in Nagorno-Karabakh. The name of the new electric energy company was "Artsakh HEK”, which already had a base capital of $5mln on the day of its inauguration.  Prime Minister of Armenia, Tigran Sargsyan called on the public and the diaspora to buy the shares of "Artsakh HEPS" and to invest in NKR economy, saying that its security and future relies on its economic growth and economic self-sufficiency. Plans included the construction of two more mini-hydro-electric power stations on the same river – “Trghe-2 and “Trghe-3” by the end of 2010 and also “Mataghis-1” and “Mataghis-2” in 2011. The realization of the given energetic program would give the chance to produce additional 120 million kwt/h of the electric power. By 2012 this would almost completely satisfy the requirements of the republic for the electric power, which would rise by then to 300 million kwt/h.

With these new power plants NKR hoped to become not only self-sufficient in terms of its electricity production, but also a net exporter of electric energy.

Road construction and Infrastructure

One of Nagorno-Karabakh's most eye-catching pieces of infrastructure is the $15 million Goris-Stepanakert road, built right after the 1991-1994 war ended by funding from the Armenian diaspora.  This road through the Lachin corridor is the only one that connects the region with Armenia and the rest of the world.

Now the construction of the 168 km "North-South" highway at a cost of only $25 million, which connects Mardakert with Stepanakert and Martuni is completed.

In recent years a Lebanese-funded phone operator company "Karabakh Telecom" was launched. Total profit from communication services has increased 12.8 percent since 2008.

Banking

ArtsakhBank has been operational since 1996 and has branches in Stepanakert and throughout various locations in Nagorno-Karabakh. It employs 243 people. Some of the leading Armenian banks also have branches in Nagorno Karabakh.

The sector is growing dynamically. As of September 1, 2010, the volume of deposits made AMD 38,664.1 mln. (~USD 107 mln.), which is 33.1% more, as compared to the level of January 1, 2010. As compared to January 1, 2010, the volume of credits issued by commercial banks increased by 28.3%.

Mining
Nagorno-Karabakh is rich in natural resources of precious and semi-precious metals, such as gold and copper and other natural resources.

Copper and gold mining has been advancing since 2002 with development and launch of operations at Drmbon deposit. Approximately 27-28 thousand tons (wet weight) of concentrates are produced with average copper content of 19-21% and gold content of 35-55 g/t. The mine is one of the biggest taxpayers of Nagorno-Karabakh and employs 1200 workers of which 65% are local citizens.

External Aid
NKR government has been a recipient of financial aid from the United States ($8 mln in 2010) and Armenia ($30 mln).

Armenian Diaspora has also been instrumental in providing some financial assistance through "Hayastan" All-Armenian Fund, Monte Melkonian Fund, Artsakh Investment Fund as well as direct micro-assistance schemes.

See also
Artsakhbank
Artsakh dram
Economy of Armenia

References

External links
 Government of Nagorno-Karabakh Republic

 
Economies of Europe